Overland Expedition may refer to:

 Overland Relief Expedition, an 1897-1898 expedition by the United States Revenue Cutter Service to rescue whalers trapped in the Arctic Ocean
 Oxford and Cambridge Far Eastern Expedition or First Overland, a 1955-1956 journey by six university students from London to Singapore
 Overland (Italian expedition), a series of expeditions and documentaries

See also
 Overland Campaign, U.S. Civil War campaign
 Overland (disambiguation)